Radim Wozniak (born 29 January 1978) is a Czech retired football player.

Wozniak, a native of Ostrava, started his football career in the clubs in this city. With FC Baník Ostrava he appeared in the Gambrinus liga. During his stay at SK České Budějovice and FK Mladá Boleslav he won the promotion from the Second League to the top flight division. In 2007, he moved to FC Hradec Králové. Three years later his team was promoted to the Gambrinus liga.

External links
 Profile at iDNES.cz
 Profile at FC Hradec Králové website

Czech footballers
1978 births
Living people
FC Baník Ostrava players
FC Hradec Králové players
SK Dynamo České Budějovice players
FK Mladá Boleslav players
Association football defenders
Sportspeople from Ostrava
FK Frýdek-Místek players